Darren Connell is a Scottish stand-up comedian and actor. He is possibly best known for playing the role of Bobby in the television series Scot Squad.

Life and career
Connell grew up in Springburn in Glasgow. He started performing stand up gigs whilst juggling a full-time job at a supermarket until fellow comedian Kevin Bridges convinced him to quit and do comedy full time. Since then, Connell has gone on to host many solo shows across the UK including an appearance at the 2016 Edinburgh Fringe Festival. Writing about his show No Filter, Jay Richardson of Chortle wrote:

In 2019, his show, Abandon All Hope played to a sell out audience at the 2019 edition of the Glasgow Comedy Festival.

Despite having very little acting experience, Connell was cast as Bobby in the BBC Scotland mockumentary series Scot Squad. The role earned him a best actor nomination at the 2015 British Academy Scotland New Talent Awards.

As of early 2019, he hosted the podcast The Darren Connell Show on Glasgow Live, which has featured guest appearances from Grado, Loki and Greg Hemphill.

Filmography

Television

Film

Awards and nominations

References

External links

Living people
Scottish stand-up comedians
Scottish male comedians
21st-century Scottish comedians
Comedians from Glasgow
People from Springburn
Year of birth missing (living people)